Bengali rock (Bengali: বাংলা রক) is a music genre in which the song lyrics are written in the Bengali language. It may refer to:

 Rock music of West Bengal
 Rock music of Bangladesh

Bengali music
Indian music
Bangladeshi music
Rock music genres